Beat the Chef is a British television cooking game show broadcast by Channel 4 and hosted by Andi Oliver. The series features contestants preparing a home-cooked family recipe, while professional chefs Mark Sargeant, Frederick Forster and Clodagh McKenna make the same recipe in an upscale restaurant version. The two dishes are then judged by a panel of food critics including BBC Food Programme presenter Leyla Kazim. The series premiered on 27 May 2019. In 2022, the series was embroiled in controversy by continuing to employ Mark Sargeant after a jury in the U.S. ruled that he sexually assaulted an American woman in Germany.

Format 
In this series hosted by restaurateur Andi Oliver, skilful amateur cooks go head-to-head with professional house chefs in fast-paced cook-offs to win a cash prize of up to £10,000. The house chefs to beat are Michelin-starred Mark Sargeant, bestselling cookbook author and celebrity chef Clodagh McKenna, award-winning chef James Tanner and Roux Scholar Frederick Forster. In each round the food jury blind taste the home cook's and the professional's dishes and vote on which they prefer. The more votes the amateur gets, the more money they win, but no votes and they go home empty-handed.

Production 
The series is produced by Twofour.

A second series will begin filming in 2020.

References 

Channel 4 original programming
British cooking television shows
2019 British television series debuts
Television series by ITV Studios